An Yong-Hak (born 25 October 1978) is a Zainichi Korean football midfielder. He is a former member of the North Korea national football team.

Club statistics
Updated to 23 February 2016.

Honours

Albirex Niigata
J2 League (1): 2003

Suwon Bluewings
K League 1 (1): 2008
Korean FA Cup (1): 2009
Korean League Cup (1): 2008

Kashiwa Reysol
J1 League (1): 2011
Japanese Super Cup (1): 2012

International goals

.''Scores and results are list North Korea's goal tally first.

References

External links

 
 

 
Yokohama FC Top Team

1978 births
Living people
Association football midfielders
Association football people from Okayama Prefecture
North Korean footballers
North Korean expatriate footballers
North Korea international footballers
2010 FIFA World Cup players
2011 AFC Asian Cup players
Albirex Niigata players
Nagoya Grampus players
Busan IPark players
Suwon Samsung Bluewings players
Omiya Ardija players
Kashiwa Reysol players
Yokohama FC players
J1 League players
J2 League players
K League 1 players
Expatriate footballers in Japan
Expatriate footballers in South Korea
North Korean expatriate sportspeople in Japan
South Korean people of North Korean origin
People from Kurashiki
Zainichi Korean people
People's Athletes